(Lord God, we all praise you), BWV130, is a chorale cantata by Johann Sebastian Bach for the Feast of archangel Michael (29 September). The oldest known version of the cantata (BWV 130.1) was performed on that feast day in 1724 during Bach's second year in Leipzig. The cantata is scored for SATB soloists and choir, three trumpets, timpani, traverso, three oboes, strings and continuo.

The text of the cantata, which is in the chorale cantata format which Bach developed for his second cantata cycle, is based on Paul Eber's 1554 Lutheran hymn in twelve stanzas "Herr Gott, dich loben alle wir". This hymn is a German version of Philipp Melanchthon's 1539 "Dicimus grates tibi". The hymn tune of the Lutheran chorale, known in English as Old 100th (Zahn Nr. 368), comes from the 1551 second edition of the Genevan Psalter.

An updated version of the cantata, BWV 130.2, was performed in Leipzig between 1732 and 1735. A manuscript which was likely written in the second half of the 18th century, contains two variant versions of the cantata.

History 

Bach composed the cantata in his second year in Leipzig for St. Michael's Day. That year, Bach composed a cycle of chorale cantatas, begun on the first Sunday after Trinity of 1724. The feast celebrated the Archangel Michael and all the angels each year on 29 September. In Leipzig, the day coincided with a trade fair.

The prescribed readings for St Michael's Day were from the Book of Revelation, Michael fighting the dragon, and from the Gospel of Matthew, heaven belongs to the children, the angels see the face of God. The cantata is based on a song in twelve stanzas by Paul Eber (1554), a paraphrase of Philipp Melanchthon's Latin "". Each stanza has four lines. The melody was first printed in the Geneva Psalter in 1551. It is attributed to Loys Bourgeois and is known as the famous tune of the Doxology "Praise God, from whom all blessings flow".

The hymn is only distantly related to the readings, concentrating on the thought that the Christians sin and deserve bad treatment, but may be raised to joy in a "" (blessed death). An unknown poet kept the first and the last two stanzas as movements 1, 5 and 6 of the cantata. He derived movement 2, a recitative, from stanzas 2 and 3, movement 3, an aria, from stanzas 4 to 6, movement 4, a recitative, from stanzas 7 to 9, and movement 5, an aria, from stanza 10. The theme of the song, praise and thanks for the creation of the angels, is only distantly related to the readings. In movement 3, a connection can be drawn from the mentioning of Satan as the "" (old dragon), to Michael's fight. Movement 4 shows examples of angelic protection in the Bible, of Daniel, and of the three men in the fiery furnace. Prayer for protection by angels, as Elijah taken to heaven, continues the text, concluded by general praise, thanks and the request for future protection.

Bach first performed the cantata on 29 September 1724.

Structure 

The cantata in six movements is festively scored for four vocal soloists (soprano, alto, tenor and bass), a four-part choir, and a Baroque instrumental ensemble of three trumpets, timpani, flauto traverso, three oboes, two violins, viola, and basso continuo.

 Chorale: 
 Recitative (alto): 
 Aria (bass): 
 Recitative (soprano, tenor): 
 Aria (tenor): 
 Chorale: 

In the opening chorus, Bach illustrates the singing of angels in different choirs by assigning different themes to the strings, the oboes and the trumpets, in a rich scoring typical only for the most festive occasions of the liturgical year such as Christmas. Mincham compares the movement to the 15 opening movements preceding it in the second annual cycle: "it is the most lavishly scored chorus so far and certainly the most extrovertly festive in character".

In movement 3, trumpets and timpani accompany the bass voice in a description of the battle against Satan. A soft duet of soprano and tenor recalls guardian angels saving Daniel in the lions' den and the three men in the furnace. John Eliot Gardiner compares the flute line in a gavotte for tenor to "perhaps the fleetness of angelic transport on Elijah's chariot". The closing choral again includes "the angelic trumpets".

Variant versions 
The manuscript P 101 at the Berlin State Library, which was likely written in the second half of the 18th century, contains two variant versions of the cantata:

Recordings 

 , Fritz Werner, Heinrich-Schütz-Chor Heilbronn, Pforzheim Chamber Orchestra, Friederike Sailer, Claudia Hellmann, Helmut Krebs, Jakob Stämpfli, Erato 1961
 Ansermet conducts Bach Cantatas No. 130, No. 67, excerpts from No. 101, Ernest Ansermet, Chœur Pro Arte de Lausanne, L'Orchestre de la Suisse Romande, Elly Ameling, Helen Watts, Werner Krenn, Tom Krause, Decca 1968
 , Helmuth Rilling, Figuralchor der Gedächtniskirche Stuttgart, Bach-Collegium Stuttgart, Kathrin Graf, Gabriele Schnaut, Adalbert Kraus, Wolfgang Schöne, Hänssler 1974
 Bach Cantatas Vol. 5, Karl Richter, Münchener Bach-Chor, Münchener Bach-Orchester, Edith Mathis, Trudeliese Schmidt, Ernst Haefliger, Peter Schreier, Archiv Produktion 1978
 J. S. Bach: Complete Cantatas, Folge / Vol. 32 – BWV 128–131, Nikolaus Harnoncourt, Tölzer Knabenchor, Concentus Musicus Wien, soloist of the Tölzer Knabenchor, Kurt Equiluz, Walter Heldwein, Teldec 1981
 J. S. Bach: Complete Cantatas Vol. 10, Ton Koopman, Amsterdam Baroque Orchestra & Choir, Caroline Stam, Michael Chance, Paul Agnew, Klaus Mertens, Antoine Marchand 1998
 Bach Edition Vol. 9 – Cantatas Vol. 4, Pieter Jan Leusink, Holland Boys Choir, Netherlands Bach Collegium, Ruth Holton, Sytse Buwalda, Knut Schoch, Bas Ramselaar, Brilliant Classics 1999
 Bach Cantatas Vol. 7: Ambronay / Bremen / For the 14th Sunday after Trinity / For the Feast of St Michael and All Angels, John Eliot Gardiner, Monteverdi Choir, English Baroque Soloists, Malin Hartelius, Richard Wyn Roberts, James Gilchrist, Peter Harvey, Soli Deo Gloria 2000
 J. S. Bach: Cantatas Vol. 33 – BWV 41, 92, 130, Masaaki Suzuki, Bach Collegium Japan, Yukari Nonoshita, Robin Blaze, Jan Kobow, Dominik Wörner, BIS 2005
 All of Bach Project, Jos van Veldhoven, Netherlands Bach Society, Maria Keohane, Maarten Engeltjes, Benjamin Hulett, Christian Immler, https://www.bachvereniging.nl/en/bwv/bwv-130/, 2013.

References

Sources 
 
 
 
 
 Dahn, Luke: BWV 130.6 bach-chorales.com

External links 
 
 BWV 130 - "Herr Gott, dich loben alle wir" Cantata notes, Emmanuel Music
 BWV 130 Herr Gott, dich loben alle wir English translation, University of Vermont
 BWV 130 Herr Gott, dich loben alle wir text, scoring, University of Alberta
 Herr Gott, dich loben alle wir, BWV 130: performance by the Netherlands Bach Society (video and background information)

Church cantatas by Johann Sebastian Bach
1724 compositions
Stefan Zweig Collection
Chorale cantatas